Alexander Ferns (born 13 October 1968) is a Scottish actor and television personality, best known for his EastEnders role as Trevor Morgan, who was described as "Britain's most-hated soap villain" when he played the role between 2000 and 2002. He is also known for his role as Rick Harper in BBC Scotland soap opera, River City, between 2017 and 2018. For his performance as coal miner Andrei Glukhov in the 2019 miniseries Chernobyl he received a BAFTA Scotland Award.

Career
Alex Ferns is the oldest of three children of his family, who left Scotland for South Africa, when Ferns was 11 years old. The family took up residence in Secunda, where Ferns′ father worked as an electrician during the construction of a power plant. After he finished school, he joined the South African Defence Force and fought in Angola between 1987 and 1989. Afterward he studied drama at the University of Cape Town. In the mid 1990s he moved back to the United Kingdom and started his career in acting.

Ferns made an appearance in The Ghost and the Darkness (1996) before various television roles, including Trevor Morgan in the BBC soap opera EastEnders from 2000 to 2002, for which he won the British Soap Award for Best Newcomer. In 2005, Ferns played Lieutenant Gordon in the highly acclaimed trilingual film Joyeux Noël, which was nominated for Best Foreign Language Film at the Oscars, Golden Globe Awards and the BAFTAs.

In 2003, Ferns appeared as Draco Malfoy in a Harry Potter sketch for Comic Relief. In 2004, he played Commander Martin Brooke, the lead role, in the short-lived ITV series Making Waves. In the same year he appeared in Man Dancin', a Festival Film & TV production, which won a number of awards on the festival circuit, including Outstanding Original Screenplay at the Sacramento Film Festival. He has also appeared on Coronation Street. He has also appeared in the 2006 movie Shadow Man, as Schmitt, also starring Steven Seagal.

His theatrical work includes the role of the "tapeworm" (a hallucination) in I.D., a play about Dimitri Tsafendas and his assassination of South African Prime Minister Hendrik Verwoerd, the 2008 national tour of Agatha Christie's murder mystery And Then There Were None, and Little Shop of Horrors as the Dentist. In 2011 he took the role of Scottish gangster Jimmy Boyle in the play about his life, The Hardman, during a Scottish tour to positive reviews.

He also made a brief appearance in the Smirnoff Vodka advert in 2009.

Ferns took part in TV series Celebrity Coach Trip, partnered with friend Ricky Groves. He starred as Luther in the 2011 London revival and subsequent UK tour of South Pacific.

In 2013, he starred as Lee in True West at Glasgow's Citizen's Theatre. In 2014, he starred in 24: Live Another Day. In 2016, Ferns starred in ITV's Vera series 6 episode 4 ("The Sea Glass") as Michael Quinn. He also appeared in BBC's Wallander series 4 episode 1 ("The White Lioness") as Axel Hedeman.

He played the leader of Tula coal miners Andrei Glukhov in the HBO 2019 miniseries Chernobyl. For this performance, he received a BAFTA Scotland Award for Best Actor in Television.

Ferns appeared in Netflix's The Irregulars (2021) as Vic Collins. He plays Gotham Police Commissioner Pete Savage in the superhero film The Batman (2022).

Personal life
Ferns has been married to South African-born actress Jennifer Woodburne since 1996. They currently live in London with their two sons, Cameron and Mackenzie.

He won the final of Kitchen Burnout in May 2010.

Filmography

Film

Television

References

External links
 

1968 births
Living people
People from Lennoxtown
British Buddhists
British male film actors
British male soap opera actors
British television personalities
South African Buddhists
South African male film actors
South African male soap opera actors
South African male television actors
South African television personalities
South African people of Scottish descent
Scottish Buddhists
Scottish male soap opera actors
Scottish male television actors
Scottish television personalities
University of Cape Town alumni